J. C. Siceloff House is a historic home located at High Point, Guilford County, North Carolina. It was built about 1920, and is a two-story, stuccoed dwelling with Colonial Revival, Mission Revival, and Prairie School design elements. Additions were constructed in the 1930s. It has a low hipped roof with widely overhanging boxed eaves and a dormer, stuccoed chimneys, and front porch and porte-cochère.  Also on the property is a contributing garage. The building has been converted to office use.

It was listed on the National Register of Historic Places in 1991.  It is located in the Uptown Suburbs Historic District.

References

Buildings and structures in High Point, North Carolina
Houses on the National Register of Historic Places in North Carolina
Colonial Revival architecture in North Carolina
Mission Revival architecture in North Carolina
Prairie School architecture in North Carolina
Houses completed in 1920
Houses in Guilford County, North Carolina
National Register of Historic Places in Guilford County, North Carolina
Historic district contributing properties in North Carolina